Hélène Gestern (born 1971) is a French writer. One of her favorite themes is photography, and the power it exercises over memory.

Works 
2011: Eux sur la photo (English title, The People in the Photo), Arléa, Coup de cœur des lycéens de Monaco 2012, Prix René Fallet 2012 and Cezam Prix Littéraire Inter CE
2013: Le Chat (short story, Émoticourt)
2013: La Part du feu, Arléa, prix littéraire des Lycéens d'île-de-France
2014: Portrait d'après blessure, Arléa, Prix Erckmann-Chatrian and prix Culture et Bibliothèques pour Tous
2016: L'Odeur de la forêt, Arléa, Feuille d'or de la ville de Nancy
2017: Un vertige, Arléa
2018: L'Eau qui dort, Arléa
2020: Armen, Arléa
2022: 555, Arléa

External links 
 Hélène Gestern's personal website
 Hélène Gestern on Babelio
 Hélène Gestern - Portrait d'après blessure on YouTube
 Prix Erckmann-Chatrian 2015 : Hélène Gestern pour Portrait d'après blessure on France 3
  Hélène Gestern on Le Figaro (in French)

21st-century French non-fiction writers
French women non-fiction writers
1971 births
Living people
21st-century French women writers